Santi di Tito (5 December 1536 – 25 July 1603) was one of the most influential and leading Italian painters of the proto-Baroque style – what is sometimes referred to as "Counter-Maniera" or Counter-Mannerism.

Biography
He was born in Florence, then its own city-state. There is little documentation to support the alleged training under Bronzino or Baccio Bandinelli. From 1558 to 1564, he worked in Rome on frescoes in Palazzo Salviati and  the Sala Grande of the Belvedere (Homage of the People) alongside Giovanni de' Vecchi and Niccolò Circignani. He acquired a classical trait, described as Raphaelesque by S. J. Freedberg. This style contrasted with the reigning ornate Roman painterliness of Federico and Taddeo Zuccari or their Florentine equivalents: Vasari, Alessandro Allori, and Bronzino.

After returning to Florence in 1564, he joined the Accademia del Disegno. He contributed two conventionally Mannerist paintings for the Duke's study and laboratory, the Studiolo of Francesco I in the Palazzo Vecchio. This artistic project was partly overseen by Giorgio Vasari. These paintings – the Sisters of Fetonte (Phaeton) and Hercules and Iole – like many of those in the studiolo, are stylized and overcrowded.

Baldinucci recounts that Santi completely rejected the maniera of Bronzino, and embraced a classical Reformist and naturalistic style. Santi went on to contribute a Sacra Conversazione for the Ognissanti and painted two altarpieces for Santa Croce in Florence: a crowded but monumental Resurrection (1570–74), and a creatively inspired and decorous Supper at Emmaus (1574).

Santi also painted a Resurrection of Lazarus for Volterra Cathedral; a Madonna for San Salvatore al Vescovo; a Burial of Christ for S. Giuseppe; a Baptism of Christ by St John for the Corsini palace, Florence. Santi died in Florence on July 23, 1603.

Santi's mature style is reflected in his masterpiece of the Vision of Saint Thomas Aquinas, also known as Saint Thomas Dedicating His Works to Christ located in the church of San Marco in Florence. It expresses a simple, pious gesture that appeared to have been lost from the courtly sensibility of Italian painting since the days of Raphael, while maintaining the brittle, demarcated colour that is classic of Tuscan works. The work has an earnest fervour lacking in his earlier mannerist works, which sometimes appear like a collection of posed statues over-painted with skin hues. This new contra-maniera style finds some echoes in the rising Bolognese Baroque style of the Carracci.

Among his pupils were Ludovico Cigoli, the leading painter of art Reform in late sixteenth and early seventeenth century Florence. Another pupil named Francesco Mochi became a prominent sculptor in the Baroque style and created, among other pieces, the colossal Saint Veronica, in the crossing of St. Peter's Basilica in Rome."

Works
Paintings
Resurrection of Lazarus (1576) - Santa Maria Novella, Florence
Sacred Conversation
Annunciation (1576) - Santa Maria Novella, Florence
Sisters of Phaeton (1572) - Studiolo of Francesco I, Palazzo Vecchio, Florence
Hercules and Iole (1572) - Studiolo of Francesco I, Palazzo Vecchio, Florence
Pietà with Saints and Military Officer - Galleria degli Uffizi, Florence
Holy Family with St. Elizabeth and John the Baptist'Tobie and the Angel (circa 1575) - Saint-Eustache, ParisDoubting Thomas (1583) - Duomo, Borgo San SepolcroCrucifixion (1588) - Santa Croce, FlorenceMarriage at Cana (1593) - Villa I Collazzi, near ScandicciSupper at Emmaus (1588) - Sant CroceAnnunciation (1602) - Santa Maria NovellaFour ages of Woman and the Written Law - Musee Fesch, Ajaccio
 Christ - Mykolas Zilinskas Art Museum, Kaunas, LithuaniaRebecca and Eliezer at the Well''  - Blanton Art Museum, Austin, Texas

Architecture
San Tommaso d'Aquino oratory, in Florence
Saint Micheal Rotunda, in Petrognano
Palazzo Nonfinito staircase, in Florence
Palazzo Dardinelli-Fenzi, in Florence
Palazzo Zanchini-Corbinelli, in Florence
Palazzo di Santi di Tito (own house), in Florence
San Michele Convent (Villa di Doccia), near Fiesole
Villa di Motrone, in Peretola (Florence)
Villa dei Collazzi, in Giogoli (Scandicci)
Villa Le Corti, in San Casciano

Gallery

References

Citations

Sources

External links

1536 births
1603 deaths
Place of death missing
People from Sansepolcro
16th-century Italian architects
16th-century Italian painters
Italian male painters
17th-century Italian painters
Painters from Tuscany
Italian Renaissance painters
Mannerist painters
Catholic painters